The 2018–19 season was Atalanta Bergamasca Calcio's eighth consecutive season in Serie A. The club competed in Serie A and the Coppa Italia, and had qualified for the second qualifying round of the UEFA Europa League following their seventh-place finish the previous season.

The season was coach Gian Piero Gasperini's third at the club.

Players

Squad information
Last updated on 26 May 2019
Appearances include league matches only

Transfers

In

Loans in

Out

Loans out

Competitions

Serie A

League table

Results summary

Results by round

Matches

Coppa Italia

UEFA Europa League

Second qualifying round

Third qualifying round

Play-off round

Statistics

Appearances and goals

|-
! colspan=14 style=background:#DCDCDC; text-align:center| Goalkeepers

|-
! colspan=14 style=background:#DCDCDC; text-align:center| Defenders

|-
! colspan=14 style=background:#DCDCDC; text-align:center| Midfielders

|-
! colspan=14 style=background:#DCDCDC; text-align:center| Forwards

|-
! colspan=14 style=background:#DCDCDC; text-align:center| Players transferred out during the season

Goalscorers

Last updated: 26 May 2019

Clean sheets

Last updated: 26 May 2019

Disciplinary record

Last updated: 26 May 2019

References

Atalanta B.C. seasons
Atalanta
Atalanta